Horse Creek is a stream in Barton, Cedar, Dade and Vernon counties in southwest Missouri. It is a tributary of Cedar Creek.

The stream source is just east of Missouri Route 97 south of Lockwood. The stream flows northwest under Route 97 and north passing under U.S. Route 160 just west of Lockwood. It flows northwest into Barton County just east of Layneville. It continues past Newport and Milford. Past Milford the stream turns northeast and flows into the southeast corner of Vernon County and into Cedar County northwest of West Independence.

According to tradition, Horse Creek was named from an incident when frontiersmen encountered a horse carcass along the creek's course.

See also
List of rivers of Missouri

References

Rivers of Barton County, Missouri
Rivers of Cedar County, Missouri
Rivers of Dade County, Missouri
Rivers of Vernon County, Missouri
Rivers of Missouri